Max Edward Taylor (born 10 January 2000) is an English professional footballer who plays for Rochdale as a defender.

Early and personal life
Born in Manchester, Taylor was known as Max Dunne until February 2019.

In June 2018, Taylor was diagnosed with and underwent treatment for testicular cancer, returning to training with Manchester United in September 2019.

Career
Taylor joined Manchester United at the age of 14. He signed his first professional contract at the start of 2018, five months before his cancer diagnosis.

He received his first call-up to the senior team in November 2019. He was given squad number 52.

In January 2020 he moved on loan to Stalybridge Celtic, making 9 appearances in all competitions.

In May 2020 he signed a new one-year contract with the club. In August 2020 he went on trial to Milton Keynes Dons with a view to a loan move.

In October 2020 he moved on loan to Kidderminster Harriers.

On 4 June 2021 it was announced that he was being released by Manchester United and would leave the club at the end of the season following the expiry of his contract.

Taylor signed for Rochdale in August 2021. He scored his first goal for the club in a 3–1 win against Northampton Town on 21 August 2021. He signed a new contract with Rochdale in August 2022.

References

2000 births
Living people
English footballers
Manchester United F.C. players
Stalybridge Celtic F.C. players
Kidderminster Harriers F.C. players
Rochdale A.F.C. players
English Football League players
Association football defenders